Figure skating at the 2009 European Youth Olympic Festival took place at the MOSiR Cieszyn, Poland between February 14 and 21, 2009. Skaters competed in the disciplines of men's singles, ladies' singles, and ice dancing.

The compulsory dance was the Paso Doble.

Results

Men

Ladies

Ice dancing

External links
 2009 European Youth Olympic Festival results
 9th Winter European Youth Olympic Festival

2009 European Youth Olympic Winter Festival
Figure skating at the European Youth Olympic Festival
2009 in figure skating
EYOF 2009
Figure skating